William F. Hooley (16 April 1861 – 12 October 1918) was a British-born American bass singer and pioneer recording artist who was popular as a solo singer, as a monologist, and as a member of several of the most successful vocal groups of the early twentieth century, including The Haydn Quartet and The American Quartet.

Biography
Hooley was born in Whitechapel, London, England, to a family of Irish origin. Although his son claimed that William was born in Cork, Ireland, a suggestion repeated elsewhere, the claim is disproved by other evidence.  He moved to the US as a child, and lived at first in Lynn, Massachusetts, later moving to Nyack, New York.

He sang in church choirs, glee clubs and operettas from the 1880s, and from about 1896 began recording as part of the Edison Quartet, with John Bieling, Samuel Holland Rous (who performed as S. H. Dudley), and Jere Mahoney.  After Mahoney was replaced by John Scantlebury Macdonald, who used the pseudonym Harry Macdonough, they took the name The Haydn Quartet in order to record for companies other than Edison.   Hooley was also, for a short time, the manager of the Excelsior Phonograph Company and then the president of the American Phonograph Company, makers of phonograph cylinders. However, neither venture was successful.

He made solo recordings, both as a bass singer — finding commercial success with his rendition of the "Gypsy Love Song" from the Broadway musical The Fortune Teller in 1899 — and as a monologist.  In 1899 he recorded popular recitations of "The Sermon on the Mount", "Mother Goose Rhymes," and "Death and Burial of Cock Robin." The following year he recorded "Lincoln's Speech at Gettysburg", and a series of recordings for children in which he recited fairy stories.  Hooley was also a member of the Lyric Trio, which initially comprised himself, John C. Havens and Estella Mann, and later, after 1901, consisted of Hooley, Harry Macdonough and Grace Spencer.

Hooley also recorded as a member of The American Quartet. This was formed in 1909 by Victor Records to provide a new showcase for their star singer, Billy Murray, who took the lead role. The other group members, with Murray and Hooley, were John Bieling and Steve Porter. The group's recordings again became popular, their early successes including "Casey Jones" (1910), "Call Me Up Some Rainy Afternoon" (with Ada Jones, 1910),  "Oh, You Beautiful Doll" (1911), and "Moonlight Bay" (1912).

Hooley made his final recordings in August 1918.  He died later that year, "suddenly and inexplicably".  at the age of 57.

References

External links
 
 William F. Hooley recordings at the Discography of American Historical Recordings.

1861 births
1918 deaths
Deaths from Spanish flu
Pioneer recording artists
American basses
Victor Records artists
Edison Records artists
Musicians from London
Singers from New York (state)
19th-century American male singers
19th-century American singers